The Texas Mexican Railway International Bridge is an international railway bridge across the Rio Grande and U.S.-Mexico border between Laredo, Texas, and Nuevo Laredo, Tamaulipas, the only rail link between these cities. Owned and operated by Texas Mexican Railway (KCS) and Kansas City Southern de México, the single-track bridge is the busiest rail border crossing in North America. It is also known as the Laredo International Railway Bridge and Puente Negro (The Black Bridge).

History
On January 1, 2005, Kansas City Southern (KCS) took control of The Texas Mexican Railway Company and the U.S. portion of the International Bridge in Laredo, Texas. The railroad is a vital link in KCS's rail network, connecting The KCS and TFM, S.A. de C.V.

Location
On the U.S. side the Bridge is located in the western termini of the Texas-Mexican Railway in Laredo, Texas. In Mexico it is located in the northern termini of the Kansas City Southern Railway in Nuevo Laredo, Tamaulipas.

Future
When the Laredo International Railway Bridge 2 is completed the Texas-Mexican Railway International Bridge will be converted to either a northbound express lane for trailers and buses, or a railroad track for passenger trains.

Aerial View

Ground View

References

International bridges in Laredo, Texas
International bridges in Tamaulipas
Railroad bridges in Texas
Railway bridges in Mexico
Bridges completed in 1920
Kansas City Southern Railway bridges
Truss bridges in the United States
Truss bridges
Metal bridges in the United States
Metal bridges
1920 establishments in Texas
1920 establishments in Mexico